Borgu is a region in north-west Nigeria and in the northern Republic of Benin. It was partitioned between Great Britain and France by the Anglo-French Convention of 1898. 
People of Borgu are known as Bariba or Borgawa.

History
According to the Kisra legend known all over Borgu, the petty kingdoms of the country were founded by Kisra, a hero who according to an oral tradition immigrated from Birnin Kisra ("the town of Kisra") in Arabia. His brothers are said to have been the founders of the kingdoms of Illo, Bussa and Nikki. Other descendants are believed to have constituted the ruling aristocracy of the Wasangari.

Colonial era

During the British colonial era, the area was within the territory claimed by the Royal Niger Company, but rivalry between Britain and France for control of the trade on the River Niger led to occupation of areas by the French, for instance at Illo, and the stationing of the British West African Frontier Force at Yashikera and elsewhere in the region.

The matter was settled by the Anglo-French Delineation Agreement and later the British Government divided Nigeria into Northern and Southern Protectorates. Borgu became part of the Northern Nigeria Protectorate. British posts were established along the Niger River and at Jebba, Zungeru, Lokoja and Illo, and a mail route was established between them for communication with Britain.

Present situation
The three major kingdoms are Bussa, Illo and Nikki. Bussa is traditionally considered to be the spiritual centre of Borgu, Nikki the centre of political power and Illo the commercial emporium.

See also
Rulers of the Bariba state of Kandi
Rulers of the Bariba state of Kwande
Rulers of the Bariba state of Nikki
Rulers of the Bariba state of Paraku

References and sources

References

Sources
Kuba, Richard: Wasangari und Wangara: Borgu und seine Nachbarn in historischer Perspektive, Hamburg 1996.
Lombard, Jacques: Structures de type féodal en Afrique noire: Étude des relations sociales chez les Bariba, Paris 1965.
Stewart, Marjorie: Borgu and its Kingdoms, Lewiston 1993.

History of Benin
History of Nigeria
French West Africa